HSC  Karolina is a high speed catamaran passenger ship owned by Croatian shipping company Jadrolinija. The ship was built by FBM Marinteknik of Singapore in 1989 as Estrala do Mar. She has five sisters, of which Dubravka, Judita, and Novalja were also bought by Jadrolinija. In 1995 she was renamed Supercat 3. In 2001 passed to Philippine Fast Ferry Corporation, and was managed by the Supercat Fast Ferry Corporation. Jadrolinija bought her in December 2004 and renamed to Karolina. The ship entered the service in May 2005, sailing on route Rijeka-Rab-Novalja.

See also
 Supercat Fast Ferry Corporation former vessels

References

Passenger ships
Passenger ships of Croatia
Individual catamarans